Georgia Theodora Hale (June 25, 1900 — June 17, 1985) was an actress of the silent movie era.

Career
Hale was Miss Chicago 1922 and competed in the Miss America Pageant. She began acting in the early 1920s, and achieved one of her most notable successes with her role in Charlie Chaplin's The Gold Rush (1925). She played Myrtle Wilson in the first filmed version (1926) of The Great Gatsby.

Chaplin cast Hale in his film based on her performance in The Salvation Hunters, which also came out in 1925. The Gold Rush temporarily made her a star, but she did not survive the transition from silent film to sound, and she only made one more film after 1928. The documentary Unknown Chaplin revealed that Hale was hired by Chaplin to replace actress Virginia Cherrill as the female lead in the film City Lights (1931) during a brief period after he had fired Cherrill (and before he re-hired her). Approximately seven minutes of test footage of Hale in the role survives; this is included in the DVD release of the film, and excerpts appear in Unknown Chaplin. The editor's introduction to Hale's memoir also reveals that she was Chaplin's original choice for the female lead in his film The Circus, a role eventually played by Merna Kennedy.

Personal life
Hale was a close companion of Chaplin in the late 1920s and early 1930s. She went on to teach dance, and later became wealthy through real estate investments in Southern California. She never married, but she lived with a male companion for the last 15 years of her life, and he received most of her estate upon her death on June 17, 1985.

According to her memoir, Hale became a follower of Christian Science. She met with Chaplin during his brief return to the United States in 1972.

Writings
Hale spoke warmly of her time with Chaplin in Unknown Chaplin. She also wrote a book about her experiences with him, titled Charlie Chaplin: Intimate Close-Ups. Written in the 1960s, it was published in 1995, a decade after her death, by The Scarecrow Press; Heather Kiernan edited the manuscript.

Filmography

References

External links

Georgia Hale at Virtual History
Photo Gallery

1900 births
1985 deaths
Actresses from Missouri
Actors from St. Joseph, Missouri
American Christian Scientists
American silent film actresses
20th-century American actresses
Converts to Christian Science